Several Canadian naval units have been named HMCS Saguenay.
  was a Second World War A-class destroyer customized for Canadian service in the North Atlantic.
   was a Cold War era  escort

Battle honours
 Atlantic 1939–42

References

 Government of Canada Ships' Histories - HMCS Saguenay

Royal Canadian Navy ship names